The British Academy Television Craft Awards of 2001 are presented by the British Academy of Film and Television Arts (BAFTA) and were held on 22 April 2001 at the Sadler's Wells Theatre, the ceremony was hosted by Liza Tarbuck.

Winners and nominees
Winners will be listed first and highlighted in boldface.

Special awards
 Brian Tufano
 World Productions

See also
 2001 British Academy Television Awards

References

External links
British Academy Craft Awards official website

2001 television awards
2001 in British television
2001 in British cinema
2001 in London
April 2001 events in the United Kingdom
2001